Marčelji is a village in Primorje, Croatia, located north of Viškovo. The population is 2,148 (census 2011).

References

Populated places in Primorje-Gorski Kotar County